Class Z: Bibliography. Library Science. Information resources is a classification used by the Library of Congress Classification system. This page outlines the sub-classes of Class Z.

Z - Books (general). Writing. Palaeography. Book Industries and trade. Libraries. Bibliography 
 4-115.5...............Books (General).  Writing.  Paleography
 4-8..................History of books and bookmaking
 40-104.5.............Writing
 41-42.5.............Autographs.  Signatures
 43-45...............Calligraphy.  Penmanship
 48..................Duplicating processes.  Copying services. Including mimeographing, multilithing
 49-51.5.............Typewriters.  Typewriting. Keyboards.  Keyboarding
 52-52.5.............Word processing
 53-102..............Shorthand.  Stenography. Phonography
 102.5-104.5.........Cryptography.  Cipher. Invisible writing
 105-115.5............Manuscript.  Paleography
 116-659...............Book industries and trade
 116.A2...............Treatises on the modern printed book
 116.A3...............Book design
 116.A5-265.5.........Printing
 124-228.............History
 231-234.............Printers and printing establishments
 234................Medallic history of printing.  Tokens
 235-236.............Printer's marks, mottoes, etc.
 237.................Paper.  Watermarks, etc.
 240-241.5...........Incunabula.  Block books. Including broadsides, playing cards
 242.9-264.5.........Practical printing. Including printing as a business, layout, paper and ink, machinery, type and type founding, electrotyping, desktop publishing, typesetting, presswork
 265-265.5...........Representation or reproduction of books, documents, etc., by photography, microphotography, or other means
 266-276..............Bookbinding.  Book decoration
 278-549..............Bookselling and Publishing
 551-656..............Copyright
 657-659..............Freedom of the press.  Censorship
 662-1000.5............Libraries
 662-664..............Collections
 665-718.8............Library science.  Information science
 668-669.7...........Library education.  Research
 672-Z672.13.........Library cooperation and coordination
 674.7-674.83........Library information networks
 675.................Classes of libraries
 678-678.88..........Library administration and organization. Constitution
 678.89-678.892......Library service agencies
 678.9-Z678.93.......Automation
 679-680.............Library buildings.  Library architecture. Including planning, space utilization, security, safety, lighting, etc.
 680.3-680.6.........Library communication systems
 681-681.3...........Reproduction of library materials.  Storage media of library materials
 681.5-681.7.........Trustees.  Library boards, committees, etc.
 682-682.4...........Personnel
 683-683.5...........Finance.  Insurance
 684-685.............Supplies.  Shelving. Bookstacks
 686.................Branches.  Delivery stations.  Bookmobiles
 687-718.85..........The collections.  The books
 688................Special collections
 688.5-688.6........Processing
 689-689.8..........Acquisition (selection, purchase, gifts, duplicates)
 690................Exchanges
 691-692............Special classes of materials. Including manuscripts, maps, microforms, serials
 693-695.83.........Cataloging
 695.85.............Library handwriting
 695.87.............Printing of catalogs
 695.9-695.94.......Indexing.  Abstracting
 695.95.............Alphabetizing.  Filing
 695.98.............Recataloging.  Reclassification
 696-697............Classification and notation
 698................Shelflisting.  Author notation
 699-699.5..........Machine methods of information and retrieval. Mechanized bibliographic control
 699.7..............Physical processing.  Shelf preparation
 700................Bookbinding
 700.9-701.5........Physical parameters, preservation, conservation and restoration of books and other library materials
 702................Thefts and losses of books and other library materials
 703.5..............Stack management. Disposition of books on shelves, etc.
 703.6..............Discarding.  Weeding
 711-711.95..........Public services.  Reference services
 712-714.............Circulation.  Loans. Charging systems
 716-716.15..........Library extension.  Library commissions.  Traveling libraries
 716.2-718.85........Libraries in relation to special topics. Including libraries and community, libraries and television, children's libraries, libraries and students
 719-723..............Libraries (General)
 729-875..............Library reports.  History.  Statistics
 881-977..............Library catalogs and bulletins
 987-996.3............Book collecting. Including bibliophilism, bookplates
 997-997.2............Private libraries
 999-1000.5...........Booksellers' catalogs
 1001-1121.............General Bibliography
 1001.................Introduction to bibliography. Theory, philosophy, psychology. Bibliography. Documentation
 1003-1003.5..........Choice of books.  Books and reading.  Book reviews
 1003.8-1004..........Biography of bibliographers
 1011-1017............General bibliographies
 1019-1033............Special classes of books. Including prohibited books, rare books, paperbacks, reprints
 1035-1035.9..........Best books
 1036.................Booksellers' general catalogs of modern books
 1037-1039............Books for special classes of persons, institutions, etc.
 1041-1107............Antonyms and pseudonyms
 1201-4980.............National bibliography
 1201-1946............America
 1215-1363..........United States
 1365-1401..........Canada.  British North America
 1411-1939..........Mexico.  Central America.  West Indies. South America
 1975................Eastern Hemisphere
 2000-2959...........Europe
 3001-3496...........Asia
 3501-3975...........Africa
 4001-4980...........Australia.  Oceania
 5051-7999............Subject bibliography. Subjects arranged in alphabetical sequence
 8001-8999............Personal bibliography. Names of individuals arranged in alphabetical sequence

ZA - Information Resources (General) 
 3038-5190...........Information resources (General) 
 3150-3159..........Information services. Information centers
 3201-3250..........Information superhighway 
 4050-4775..........Information in specific formats or media 
 4050-4480.........Electronic information resources 
 4150-4380........Computer network resources
 4450-4460........Databases
 4550-4575..........Motion pictures. Video recordings 
 4650-4675..........Pictures. Photographs 
 4750-4775..........Sound recordings 
 5049-5190...........Government information

References

Further reading 
 Full schedule of all LCC Classifications
 List of all LCC Classification Outlines

Z